Dallon is a commune in the Aisne department in Hauts-de-France in northern France.

It is located on the banks of the Somme and its marshes, and the canal Saint-Quentin. Its former name is Dalonaie, on record in the year 1035.

Population

Sights
Eglise Saint Medard
Calvary

See also
Communes of the Aisne department

References

Communes of Aisne